Pedro Petiz (born 29 October 1986 in Porto, Portugal) is a Portuguese racing driver.

He was the 2007 champion of the Renault Eurocup.

Since 2009 he has raced in the Superleague Formula and has raced for Sporting CP in the 2009 season.

Motorsports Career Results

Superleague Formula

Super Final Results

References

External links
 Official website
 Driver Database information

Portuguese racing drivers
1986 births
Living people
Superleague Formula drivers
Eurocup Mégane Trophy drivers
Sportspeople from Porto
Porsche Supercup drivers
Tech 1 Racing drivers